Materada   is a village in Croatia.

Populated places in Istria County